is a Japanese AV actress and adult model. A highly prolific performer, she had appeared in more than 900 adult videos, with 800 currently listed on the site of the major Japanese video retailer DMM.

Biography

Yuka Osawa - AV debut
Akira was born in Saudi Arabia to a Japanese mother and Syrian father and is the second of three daughters. She has stated that although she was born in Saudi Arabia, she grew up in Tokyo, Japan and was not raised with the Islamic sense of morality that might consider women showing skin haram.

She started her AV career in July 2005 under the name of Yuka Osawa with the video First Flower (Debut) - Yuka Osawa for the KUKI production studios and around 2006 she transferred to the highly esteemed AV studio S1 No. 1 Style. However, after a few films, she became a freelance (kikatan) actress working with many studios. She earned the title Queen Shiofuki (or splash queen) after a string of movies from 2007 with names like Tokyo Slimy Night, Splash Girl and Non Stop Orgasm.

Akira made her debut in the softcore genre of pink film in 2007, appearing in three titles directed by Yutaka Ikejima including Fascinating Woman: The Temptation of Creampie, which was named as Best Film 8th Place at the 20th Pink Grand Prix, a Japanese annual film awards event. For her work in these films, Akira was given one of the Best New Actress awards.

Akira (than known as Osawa) quickly became known for prolific output and willingness to appear in extreme or highly fetishist roles. She became a regular go-to-actress for studios like Dogma or Natural High and even performed the most demanding type of roles that included anal sex, S&M, enemas, and urolagnia.

At the 2009 AV Grand Prix Awards, Akira (as Yuka Osawa) took two top prizes, the Digital Sales Award for her video Vomit Enema Ecstasy X co-starring Mayura Hoshitsuki for the Dogma studio, and a second award, the Best Lovely / Moe Video for her solo work Tera-Dick (Real Creampie Absolute Angel).

Elly Akira
In March 2010, she was one of five actresses nominated as Best Actress at the Adult Broadcasting Awards ceremony.

Akira was on hand in January 2011 to help launch a new label Atom for one of Japan's largest AV producers, Soft On Demand (SOD). On 19 November 2011, she starred in W Monster - Golden Showers Anal And Creampies along with fellow AV actress Marica Hase.

In 2012, video retailer DMM held a vote for the 30th anniversary of the debut of adult videos in Japan to determine the best actresses. Akira was selected as one of the top 100 AV actresses of all time, coming in at number 55. Also in 2012, she starred as a female ninja (kunoichi) in the action period movie  which reached theaters in June 2012.

In June 2012, she took a part in the Japanese show, where two people are placed together in an apartment for one day to see what will happen. At certain moments they post their thoughts to the Twitter. In this episode, the show places Akira together with a 21-year-old college student virgin.

Akira had traveled to Taiwan as an artist and disaster fundraiser in 2009 but she was also known there as an AV Idol. In June 2012, the Taiwan online news service NowNews selected her at number five in their list of the Ten Top Japanese AV actresses under her previous name of Yuka Osawa.

Akira retired from active performing around late 2012, and only made some sporadic AV appearances in 2014 and 2015 like the tentacle-porn themed 2-Hole Tentacular Confinement for Moodyz. After spending some time away from the industry, Akira announced her return in July 2019 on her new Twitter account with her returning film co-starring famous AV actress Yui Hatano.

Photographer and artist
Akira debuted as a photographer in 2008 under her birth name, Fareeza Terunuma, and in 2009 appeared as the subject of her own exhibition at the 12th Geisai Art Fair. As a performance artist, she was attired as a toilet surrounded by a series of self-portraits. Her exhibit won the  Award.

As Terunuma, she held a photo exhibition in Tokyo in May–June 2009 and later that year in November 2009, she was one of a group of well-known artists who were invited to design T-shirts to raise money for the victims of Typhoon Morakot. The venture, 1NCOMING Aid, was sponsored by the Taiwan magazine 1NCOMING and the Greystone Arsenal boutique in Taiwan. Akira travelled to the store for an autograph session to promote the venture. In September 2010, she had a solo exhibit at the Vanilla Gallery in Ginza. and also had her own show of artwork at The Artcomplex Center of Tokyo (A.C.T.) in November 2010.

The Japanese publishing company East Press published a volume of her photographs in December 2011 under the title . Her work's combining of art, food, and sexual desire was commented on in the "EAT ART" exhibition at the Design Festa gallery in Tokyo.

She traveled to Taiwan again in August 2012 for an exhibit of her artwork in Taipei and Tainan.

Filmography

Adult videos (AV)

Pink films
 , dir. Yutaka Ikejima, OP Eiga, May 2007
 Fascinating Woman: The Temptation of Creampie, dir. Yutaka Ikejima, OP Eiga, August 2007
 , dir. Yutaka Ikejima, OP Eiga, November 2007

Mainstream films
  (2009)
  (2010)
  (2012)

References

External links

新井エリー - livedoor公式ブログ

1986 births
Japanese female adult models
Japanese pornographic film actresses
Living people
People from Mecca
21st-century Japanese actresses
Japanese women artists
Japanese photographers
Japanese people of Syrian descent